Dombrava is a settlement in the lower Vipava Valley in the Municipality of Renče–Vogrsko in the Littoral region of Slovenia.

References

External links 
Dombrava on Geopedia

Populated places in the Municipality of Renče-Vogrsko